Rhinella chrysophora, sometimes known as the Rio Viejo toad, is a species of toad in the family Bufonidae. It is endemic to the Cordillera Nombre de Dios on the Atlantic versant in north-central Honduras.

Description
Based on the type series consisting of two adult males (including the holotype) and an adult female, males measure  and females  in snout–vent length. The parotoid gland is subtriangular. The fingers have no webbing whereas the toes are webbed. The dorsum is pale to dark lime green with olive brown blotching and pale lime green lateral or dorsolater stripes. There are rusty brick red pustules. The venter is pale blue-green, with dark chocolate brown mottling.

The tadpoles are "gastromyzophorous", that is, torrent-adapted tadpoles that bear an abdominal sucker. They resemble those of another bufonid genus, Atelopus, although the adults are different. The suctorial disc is large, extending about three-fourths length of body. The coloration is black with gold markings. A newly metamorphosed juvenile with a tail stub measured  in snout–vent length.

Habitat and conservation
The tadpoles develop in mountain streams, clinging to rocks and boulders. It is threatened by habitat loss caused by landslides and slash-and-burn agriculture. The range of the species include the Pico Bonito National Park.

References

chrysophora
Endemic fauna of Honduras
Amphibians of Honduras
Amphibians described in 1989
Taxonomy articles created by Polbot